Sigma Editions is an independent record label founded in 1998 by Rosy Parlane and Dion Workman (both ex-members of Thela). It specializes in electronic music and experimental music.

Overview
The label began in Melbourne, Australia, relocated to Rotterdam, Netherlands in 1999, then to London, United Kingdom in 2000. The label is based in New York City. The name is a reference to Alexander Trocchi's plan for a utopian artist colony.

Artists
Artists who have released material on Sigma Editions include Parmentier, Rosy Parlane, Dion Workman, Minit, David Haines, Julien Ottavi, Vladislav Delay, and Joyce Hinterding.

See also
 List of record labels

External links
 Discography of Sigma Editions at Discogs

American independent record labels
Australian record labels
Record labels established in 1998
Electronic music record labels
Experimental music record labels
Record labels based in Melbourne